Sergio Pola (1 November 1674 – 1748) was an Italian Bishop of the Roman Catholic Diocese of Famagusta from his appointment by on 19 June 1706, until his death in 1748.

Sergio Pola was born in Treviso, Italy as a member of the House of Pola. He was a member of the team, which prepared the background papers for the beatification of cardinal Gregorio Barbarigo. Sergio died in 1748 in Italy, at the age of 73.

Sources 
 (It) Florio Miari: Cronache Bellunesi inedite dal conte Florio Miari, 1865, p. 137

Specific

External links
 

1674 births
1748 deaths
18th-century Italian Roman Catholic bishops
People from Treviso